Seyyedabad (also Romanized as Seyyedābād; also known as Seyyed Lar) is a village in Ozomdel-e Shomali Rural District, in the Central District of Varzaqan County, East Azerbaijan Province, Iran. At the 2006 census, its population was 43, in 9 families.

References 

Towns and villages in Varzaqan County